Self-dissimilarity is a measure of complexity defined in a series of papers by David Wolpert and William G. Macready.
The degrees of self-dissimilarity between the patterns of a system observed at various scales (e.g. the average matter density of a physical body for volumes at different orders of magnitude) constitute a complexity "signature" of that system.

See also 
Diversity index
Index of dissimilarity
Jensen–Shannon divergence
Self-similarity
Similarity measure
Variance

References 

Information theory
Complex systems theory
Measures of complexity